Hajji Baluch Khan (also Romanized as Ḩājjī Balūch Khān; also known as Deh-e Ḩājj Balūch Khān and Ḩājj Balūch Khān) is a village in Jahanabad Rural District, in the Central District of Hirmand County, Sistan and Baluchestan Province, Iran. At the 2006 census, its population was 82, in 17 families.

References 

Populated places in Hirmand County